Schaggi Streuli (1899–1980) was a Swiss film and television actor, who also starred on stage at the Bernhard-Theater Zürich.

Selected filmography
 Gilberte de Courgenay (1942)
 Madness Rules (1947)
 Palace Hotel (1952)
 Sacred Waters (1960)

References

External links

1899 births
1980 deaths
People from Pfäffikon District
Swiss male film actors